The 2018 Internationaux de Strasbourg was a professional tennis tournament played on clay courts. It was the 32nd edition of the tournament and part of the International-level tournament category of the 2018 WTA Tour. It took place at the Tennis Club de Strasbourg in Strasbourg, France, between 21 and 26 May 2018.

Points and prize money

Prize money

Singles main draw entrants

Seeds

 Rankings are as of May 14, 2018.

Other entrants
The following players received wildcards into the singles main draw:
  Dominika Cibulková
  Fiona Ferro
  Lucie Šafářová

The following player received entry using a protected ranking into the singles main draw:
  Réka Luca Jani

The following players received entry from the qualifying draw:
  Kaia Kanepi
  Marina Melnikova
  Tereza Mrdeža
  Chloé Paquet
  Katarzyna Piter
  Camilla Rosatello

The following players received entry as lucky losers:
  Luksika Kumkhum
  Elena Rybakina

Withdrawals 
Before the tournament
  Catherine Bellis → replaced by  Magda Linette
  Alizé Cornet → replaced by  Réka Luca Jani
  Camila Giorgi → replaced by  Luksika Kumkhum
  Beatriz Haddad Maia → replaced by  Sachia Vickery
  Aleksandra Krunić → replaced by  Amandine Hesse
  Monica Niculescu → replaced by  Elena Rybakina
  Monica Puig → replaced by  Natalia Vikhlyantseva
  Aryna Sabalenka → replaced by  Sofia Kenin
  Donna Vekić → replaced by  Jennifer Brady
  Elena Vesnina → replaced by  Pauline Parmentier

Retirements 
  Ashleigh Barty

Doubles main draw entrants

Seeds 

 1 Rankings as of May 14, 2018.

Other entrants 
The following pair received a wildcard into the doubles main draw:
 Joanna Tomera /  Wallis Vitis

Finals

Singles

  Anastasia Pavlyuchenkova defeated  Dominika Cibulková, 6–7(5–7), 7–6(7–3), 7–6(8–6)

Doubles

  Mihaela Buzărnescu /  Raluca Olaru defeated  Nadiia Kichenok /  Anastasia Rodionova, 7–5, 7–5

References

 Official website

2018 WTA Tour
2018
2018 in French tennis
Internationaux de Strasbourg